Leimen is the name of:
 Leimen (Baden), in Baden-Württemberg
 Leimen (Palatinate), in Rhineland-Palatinate